The Barnhart–Wright House is a historic house located in the Irvington neighborhood of Portland, Oregon, United States. It was built in 1913–1914 by general contractor Frederic E. Bowman, whose constructions shaped several neighborhoods in the city. It stands as one of the best-preserved and most expensive single-family homes in his body of work, and is an outstanding example of the use of Arts and Crafts architecture with Prairie School influences in an upper-class Portland home.

The house was listed on the National Register of Historic Places in 1997.

See also
 National Register of Historic Places listings in Northeast Portland, Oregon

References

External links

Oregon Historic Sites Database entry

1914 establishments in Oregon
Arts and Crafts architecture in Oregon
Houses completed in 1914
Houses on the National Register of Historic Places in Portland, Oregon
Irvington, Portland, Oregon
Prairie School architecture in Oregon
Portland Historic Landmarks